Route 332 is a collector road in the Canadian province of Nova Scotia. It is located in Lunenburg County, connecting Bridgewater at Trunk 3 with Lunenburg at Trunk 3. It is commonly referred to residences as Riverport Road as the village appears on all major road signage in the county.

Communities
Upper LaHave
Middle LaHave
East LaHave
Riverport
Rose Bay
Bayport
First South
Lunenburg
Garden Lots

Trails
The Riverport & District Community Development Committee submitted a recommended name to the Lunenburg Active Transportation Plan to the Municipality of the District of Lunenburg (MODL). It was to recognize the important role played by Riverport on the LaHave River over the past two hundred and fifty years.  Most major infrastructure in the area, e.g., the fire department; school, post office, electric utility, fish plant and churches. Highway 332, has traditionally been known to local residences as the Riverport Road. This goes back as far as the 1870s with the creation of the Ritcey Cove Circuit which was renamed to the Riverport District.

Parks
Ovens Natural Park

History

The entirety of Collector Highway 332 was once designated as Trunk Highway 32.

See also
List of Nova Scotia provincial highways

References
Riverport District Website

Nova Scotia provincial highways
Roads in the Region of Queens Municipality
Roads in Lunenburg County, Nova Scotia